Negrea may refer to:

 Negrea, a village in Hîncești District, Moldova
 Negrea, a village in the commune Schela, Galați County, Romania
 Negrea, a tributary of the Crișul Repede in Cluj County, Romania
 Negrea (Lozova), a tributary of the Lozova in Galați County, Romania
 Negrea (beetle), a genus of beetles

See also 
 Neagra (disambiguation)
 Neagra River (disambiguation)